Jean-Philippe Chainiaux, stage name Dopefish or DJ Dopefish, also known by the name DJ System-D or System-D in drum and bass music; is a Belgian DJ, performing in the electronic, dance, hip-hop, and drum and bass scenes.

As well as producing his own records, he has released numerous CDs with his own remixes of other songs.

Music style and genre
He is known for his wide-ranging sets that include everything from breaks, electro house, baile funk, and fidget house to hip-hop, Miami bass, grime, and dubstep. He is a fan of scratch and turntablism, and currently plays most of the time on 3 or 4 turntables.

Career
He began his career in his native Belgium in 1992, starting out as an ordinary DJ, having been playing around with his vinyls when he was just 15 years old. Passionate about hip-hop and DJing techniques, in 1994, he discovered jungle music. At the beginning of 1996 he started playing only jungle and drum and bass and in that same year he began hosting radio shows in Brussels at Action FM.

After that the number of his performances increased significantly all over Europe, becoming a regular at famous clubs in Belgium such as Fuse (Brussels), Tour de l'Est (Antwerp), La Chapelle (Liège), and playing at big festivals such as Pukkelpop (in 2003), 10Days Of Techno, Tomorrowland, Groove City, Dour Festival, Antwerp is Burning, Star Warz, and It's Like A Jungle.

In 1998, under the name System-D, he won the "Drum & Bass Arena" mixtape competition. That same year he was crowned "Best DJ" (excl. UK) by the legendary British magazine Knowledge.

In 2000, he decided to begin promoting the INSIDE events. Laters he organized other events like Volume, Organic, Warning, and Body Movin'.

System-D signed on Intercom Rec. in 2004 (E-Z Rollers, UK) for whom he released a few 12", and also appeared on the New Skool Blazers LP. He collaborated on the D&B album of the New-Yorkean MC Jamalski (BDP/KRS-One).

He set up his own label Dopefish A.U.D.I.O in 2007 but is also currently signed with Big Alliance Records.

Discography

As "Dopefish"

Albums

Singles and EPs

Remixes, mash-ups and other releases

As "System-D"

Singles and EPs

Music videos

References

External links

Dopefish
Official website

System-D
Official website

Club DJs
Belgian house musicians
Belgian DJs
Living people
Belgian record producers
Year of birth missing (living people)
Place of birth missing (living people)
Electronic dance music DJs